Neruda is a 2016 internationally co-produced biographical drama film directed by Pablo Larraín. Mixing history and fiction, the film shows the dramatic events of the suppression of Communists in Chile in 1948 and how the poet, diplomat, politician and Nobel Prize winner Pablo Neruda had to go on the run, eventually escaping on horseback over the Andes.

Plot
In 1946, Chile's president Gabriel González Videla wins the election with the support of the Communists, but later turns against them, banning the party and ordering mass arrests. Senator Pablo Neruda, a former ambassador and renowned poet, speaks out against the repression, putting himself in danger. With his wife Delia, he attempts to flee to Argentina through the mountains, but they are turned back at the border and forced to go into hiding.

Óscar Peluchonneau, a young policeman, is tasked with hunting down Neruda. To catch him, Peluchonneau believes he needs to know him, so he studies Neruda's life and poetry. Meanwhile, Neruda makes surprise appearances, leaving volumes of his poetry with people to mobilize resistance. A game of cat and mouse ensues, with Peluchonneau always a step behind. When the hunt becomes too close, Neruda's friends arrange for smugglers to take him over the border on horseback.

Delia stays behind and is interrogated by Peluchonneau. She tells him that every story has a primary character, and in this story, the cop is secondary. This remark unnerves Peluchonneau, who is never certain of his inner identity. Delia destroys his confidence by saying that Neruda, with his poetry and political commitment, is reality and will endure, but Peluchonneau is merely a fiction.

As Neruda's group climbs through the wintry forests towards the border, Peluchonneau follows, but he cannot catch up. He dies on a snow-covered mountaintop, bludgeoned by his own indigenous companions. Neruda later finds his corpse. Peluchonneau's hold on reality has ended, and he has melted back into fiction. Neruda flies to Paris, where he is welcomed by his friend Pablo Picasso and becomes a media sensation. During a press conference, Neruda mentions Peluchonneau's name, allowing him to live on through memory.

Cast

 Luis Gnecco as Pablo Neruda
 Gael García Bernal as Óscar Peluchonneau
 Alfredo Castro as Gabriel González Videla
 Mercedes Morán as Delia del Carril
 Diego Muñoz as Martínez
 Pablo Derqui as Víctor Pey
 Michael Silva as Álvaro Jara
 Jaime Vadell as Arturo Alessandri
 Marcelo Alonso as Pepe Rodríguez
 Francisco Reyes as Bianchi
 Alejandro Goic as Jorge Bellett
 Emilio Gutiérrez Caba as Pablo Picasso
 Antonia Zegers
 Héctor Noguera
 Amparo Noguera
 Ximena Rivas
 Pablo Schwarz
 Néstor Cantillana
 Marcial Tagle
 Cristián Campos
 José Soza

Release
It was screened in the Directors' Fortnight section at the 2016 Cannes Film Festival. It was selected as the Chilean entry for the Best Foreign Language Film at the 89th Academy Awards but it was not nominated.

After the world premiere at Cannes on 13 May 2016, The Orchard and Wild Bunch acquired U.S and French distribution rights, respectively. It was shown at the Telluride Film Festival on 4 September 2016 and the Toronto International Film Festival on 8 September 2016. It screened at the New York Film Festival on 5 October 2016.

The film was released in Chile on 11 August 2016 by 20th Century Fox, in the United States on 16 December 2016, and in France on 4 January 2017.

Critical response

Awards and accolades

See also
 Il Postino, award-winning 1994 film about Neruda
 List of submissions to the 89th Academy Awards for Best Foreign Language Film
 List of Chilean submissions for the Academy Award for Best Foreign Language Film

References

External links
 
 

2016 films
2016 drama films
2016 biographical drama films
2010s chase films
2010s Spanish-language films
American biographical drama films
Argentine biographical drama films
Chilean biographical drama films
French biographical drama films
Spanish biographical drama films
Films directed by Pablo Larraín
Films scored by Federico Jusid
Biographical films about poets
Films about communism
Films about Nobel laureates
Films set in 1948
Films set in 1949
Films set in Chile
Films set in Paris
Cultural depictions of Pablo Picasso
Cultural depictions of Pablo Neruda
Participant (company) films
20th Century Fox films
The Orchard (company) films
Films shot in Chile
Films shot in Argentina
Films shot in Paris
2010s American films
2010s French films
2010s Argentine films
2010s Spanish films
Spanish-language American films
Spanish-language French films
2010s Chilean films